The Misagh-3 is an Iranian infrared homing short range air defense system manufactured by MODAFL of Iran and unveiled in 2017. 

Misagh-3 is an upgraded version of Misaqh-1 and misagh-2 that were based on the QW-18.

Design
The Misagh-3 has a range of five kilometers and a maximum flight height of 4000 meters with a maximum flight speed of 850 m/s (2.88 Mach) and a 1.4 kilograms of high-explosion warhead. 

To deal with the thermal disruptor (flare) in helicopters and fighter jets, it' equipped with a 360 degrees laser fuse system. After the MANPAD is fired, a laser radiation source inside the missile spreads the light around 360 degrees; As soon as it approaches the target and reflects the light of the laser light that hits the considered target, the warhead of the missile is activated.

References

Post–Cold War weapons of Iran
Surface-to-air missiles of Iran
Military equipment introduced in the 2010s